Sanjay Pal, PhD in Biotechnology from IIT Kharagpur, faculty in School of Biotechnology, Amrita Vishwa Vidyapeetham, Kollam, Kerala.

He is co-ordinating the Sanitation Biotechnology Laboratory which is among the six awardees in "Reinvent the Toilet Challenge India" grant from Bill & Melinda Gates Foundation jointly with BIRAC (Department of Biotechnology), India.

References

External links
Profile:

ResearchGate
Google Scholar

Living people
Scientists from Kollam
Indian biotechnologists
Year of birth missing (living people)